Kalakalappu is a 2001 Tamil language drama film directed by Vishwa and produced by A. L. Azhagappan. The film stars Napoleon, with Udhaya, Jaya Seal and Vijayalakshmi in supporting roles. It was released on 27 July 2001.

Plot
Kuzhandhaivel @ Velu is a rich landlord in Courtallam leading a happy life with his wife Thilaka and daughter Pooja. Thilaka is none other than Velu’s niece. Velu's widowed elder sister (who is also Thilaka's mother) and Thilaka's younger sister Divya also live with them. Divya falls in love with her classmate Karna who is a rich man based out of Chennai. To win Velu's heart, Karna comes to Courtallam and works as a servant in Velu's home. Divya informs the truth about Karna and her love to Thilaka for which she agrees. But she hides this to Velu and waits for the right moment to disclose the truth.

One day, during heavy rain, Thilaka accidentally steps over a wire and passes away due to electric shock. Velu is devastated due to his wife's death. Thilaka's mother proposes to have Velu marry Divya, so that he can start a fresh life for which Velu doesn't agree. However, everyone in the family convinces him. Divya is shocked knowing the wedding plans between her and Velu. Karna calms down Divya.

There arrives Mini (Uma) who happens to be the classmate of Karna and Divya. Mini informs Divya that Karna is a womanizer and accuses him of having a relationship with her. Divya doesn't trust Mini, but is surprised to learn that Mini is pregnant. Divya breaks up with Karna and decides to marry Velu itself. Accidentally, Velu learns of the love affair between Karna and Divya following which Divya tells Velu about the real identity of Karna.

Velu gets furious and sends his henchmen to get Karna back, so that Karna can be married to Mini. Karna refuses to marry Mini for which Velu’s henchmen beat Karna. Now Mini comes to rescue and informs the truth. Actually, Mini is a very good friend of Karna and she is already married to someone else. Karna requested Mini to help him breakup with Divya, so that Divya can marry Velu as per elders' wishes. Everyone understands the good nature of Karna and decides to have him marry Divya. In the end, Karna gets married to Divya.

Cast
Napoleon as Kuzhandhaivel
Udhaya as Karna
Jaya Seal as Thilaka
Vijayalakshmi as Divya
Uma as Mini
Ramesh Khanna as Sreenivasan (Mittai)
Ponnambalam as Kozhandha
Sukumar as Kozhandha's Henchman
Vimal as Karna's College Mate

Soundtrack
The film score and the soundtrack were composed by Deva. The soundtrack, released in 2001, features 5 tracks.

References

2001 films
2000s Tamil-language films
Indian comedy-drama films
Films scored by Deva (composer)
2001 comedy-drama films